Will Mayfield College was a Baptist school located in Marble Hill, Missouri.  From 1878 to 1934, the college offered four years of preparatory school and two years of junior college work.

Will Mayfield was founded by William Henderson Mayfield and Dr. H. J. Smith as the Mayfield-Smith Academy in Smithville (now Sedgewickville) in Bollinger County.  It was governed by the St. Francois Baptist Association.

In 1880, the college was moved to the county seat at Marble Hill; the first building was completed in 1885. Historically known as the Administration Building, it was also used for classrooms, chapel and auditorium space. Significant additions designed by L. Baylor Pendleton were constructed in 1909 and 1924–25. The original section of this brick building is typical of two-story, four room educational buildings. The name of the school was changed in 1903 to Will Mayfield College in honor of William Henderson Mayfield's son, Will, who was a graduate of Mayfield-Smith Academy and who had died the previous year at the age of 20.  The Arts and Science Building is a two-story brick building with raised basement has Classical Revival details and was constructed in 1924-1927 from plans by L. Baylor Pendleton.

Will Mayfield College permanently ceased operations in 1934 due to financial reasons.  The Bollinger County Museum of Natural History is now operating on the grounds of the college. The Mayfield Cultural Center is housed in the original Administration Building and the attached chapel, with stage and balcony. The building is used as a visual and performing arts space and is also available for use as a banquet facility for weddings and special occasions. Both the museum and cultural center are projects of the Will Mayfield Heritage Foundation, a 501(c)3 non profit organization.

The Arts and Science Building was listed on the National Register of Historic Places in 2005.  The remainder of the campus was added in 2012.

References

External links
 Pictures of Will Mayfield College
 St. Francois Baptist Association
 Bollinger County Museum of Natural History

University and college buildings on the National Register of Historic Places in Missouri
Defunct private universities and colleges in Missouri
Educational institutions established in 1878
Educational institutions disestablished in 1934
Education in Bollinger County, Missouri
1878 establishments in Missouri
1934 disestablishments in Missouri
Neoclassical architecture in Missouri
Buildings and structures completed in 1927
National Register of Historic Places in Bollinger County, Missouri